Next → 2017

Bowling at the 2015 ASEAN Para Games was held at Temasek Club, Singapore.

Medal table

Medalists

Singles

Doubles

Trios

External links
 8th ASEAN Para Games 2015 - Singapore

2015 ASEAN Para Games
Bowling at the ASEAN Para Games